The 2012 Stock Car Corrida do Milhão (Stock Car Million Race) was the fourth edition of Stock Car Corrida do Milhão and was the last round of the 2012 Stock Car Brasil season held over the 7–9 December at the Autódromo José Carlos Pace in São Paulo, Brazil. 2012 edition had Formula 1 and IndyCar Series drivers Rubens Barrichello, Tony Kanaan, Hélio Castroneves and Raphael Matos as guest drivers. The race was won by Thiago Camilo and Cacá Bueno won the 2012 Stock Car Brasil championship.

Teams and drivers

Classification

Qualifying

Notes
 — Ricardo Zonta and Júlio Campos received a fifteen-place grid penalty for causing a collision at eleventh round in Curitiba.

Race

References

External links
 Official website of the Stock Car Brasil (in Portuguese)

Stock Car Brasil
Stock Car Brasil season

pt:Temporada da Stock Car Brasil de 2012